Pizzo Malora is a mountain of the Lepontine Alps, located in the Swiss canton of Ticino.

References

External links
 Pizzo Malora on Hikr

Mountains of the Alps
Mountains of Switzerland
Mountains of Ticino
Lepontine Alps